Abdelkader Jerbi (died 3 February 2021) was a Tunisian film director.

Jerbi died from COVID-19 in 2021.

Filmography
Khatini (1986)
El Douar (1992)
El Assifa (1993)
El Hassad (1995)
Souloukiyet (Comportements) (1998–2001)
Ya Zahra Fi Khayali (2000)
Malla Ena (2001)
Douroub Elmouejha (2002)
Mal Wa Amal (2005)
Nwassi w Ateb (2006)
 Season 6 (2009)
Min Ayam Mliha (2010)

The series Ahna S'hab was not broadcast during Ramadan 2014 as was planned.

References

2021 deaths
Tunisian film directors
Year of birth missing
Deaths from the COVID-19 pandemic in Tunisia